The 2019–20 FC Krasnodar season was the ninth successive season that Krasnodar played in the Russian Premier League, the highest tier of association football in Russia. They finished the previous season in 3rd place, qualifying for the UEFA Champions League for the first time, entering at the third-qualifying round. They also took part in the Russian Cup.

Season events
On 20 May 2019, Krasnodar announced that Kaio had signed on a five-year contract from Santa Clara. Two days later, 22 May, Krasnodar announced their second signing of the summer, with Younes Namli signing a four-year contract from PEC Zwolle.

On 10 June, Krasnodar announced the signing of Ruslan Kambolov on a two-year contract from Rubin Kazan.

On 19 June, Andrei Tekuchyov joined Chayka Peschanokopskoye on loan for the season.

On 20 June, Krasnodar announced the signing of Tonny Vilhena on a long-term contract from Feyenoord. The next day, 21 June, Roman Kurazhov joined KAMAZ on a season-long loan and Oleg Lanin joined Yenisey Krasnoyarsk on a season-long loan.

On 27 June, Daniil Fomin moved to FC Ufa on a permanent deal.

On 11 July, Roman Shishkin left Krasnodar by mutual consent.

On 13 July, Krasnodar announced the signing of Marcus Berg on a one-year contract.

On 25 July, Krasnodar announced the signing of Rémy Cabella from AS Saint-Étienne.

On 31 July, Artyom Golubev joined Ufa on loan until 31 May 2021.

On 27 August, Andrei Ivan left Krasnodar to rejoin Universitatea Craiova.

On 2 September, Krasnodar announced the signing of Manuel Fernandes on a free transfer following his release from Lokomotiv Moscow at the end of the previous season, and Aleksei Gritsayenko joined Tambov on loan until the end of the season. Yegor Sorokin also signed for Krasnodar on 2 September from Rubin Kazan to a five-year contract, whilst remaining at Rubin on loan for the remainder of the 2019/20 season.

On 20 September, Krasnodar announced that they had terminated the contract of Pavel Mamayev.

On 11 December, Aleksei Tatayev moved permanently to Mladá Boleslav.

On 28 December, Krasnodar announced that Ivan Ignatyev had been sold to Rubin Kazan, with the move becoming official on 2 January 2020.

On 30 December, Yegor Sorokin was recalled from his loan at Rubin Kazan.

On 7 January, Dmitri Skopintsev moved to Dynamo Moscow.

On 15 January, Younes Namli joined Colorado Rapids on loan until the end of December 2021.

On 17 March, the Russian Premier League postponed all league fixtures until April 10th due to the COVID-19 pandemic.

On 1 April, the Russian Football Union extended the suspension of football until 31 May.

On 15 May, the Russian Football Union announced that the Russian Premier League season would resume on 21 June.

On 16 June, Krasnodar announced that Murad Musayev had passed the appropriate coaching courses to be confirmed as their Head Coach.

On 17 June, FC Rostov announced that six of their players had tested positive for COVID-19, putting their upcoming fixture against Krasnodar in jeopardy.

On 21 June, the Krasnodar vs Dynamo Moscow match scheduled for the same day was postponed until 19 July due to an outbreak of COVID-19 in the Dynamo Moscow squad.

On 26 June, it was announced that Krasnodar's fixture against Orenburg scheduled for 27 June would not take place due to an outbreak of COVID-19 in the Orenburg squad, and was subsequently awarded to Krasnodar as a 3-0 technical victory.

Squad

Out on loan

Transfers

In

 Transfers announced on the above date, becoming official when the Russian transfer window opened.

Out

Loans out

Released

Friendlies

Competitions

Premier League

Results by round

Results

League table

Russian Cup

UEFA Champions League

Qualifying rounds

UEFA Europa League

Group stage

Squad statistics

Appearances and goals

|-
|colspan="14"|Players away from the club on loan:

|-
|colspan="14"|Players who left Krasnodar during the season:

|}

Goal scorers

Clean sheets

Disciplinary record

References

FC Krasnodar seasons
Krasnodar
Krasnodar